Peter Atkinson is an Irish sportsperson.  He plays hurling with his local club Hwh Bunclody and was a member of the Wexford senior inter-county team from 2009 to 2013.

Playing career
Atkinson made his senior debut against Offaly on 30 May 2009 after being called up by Wexford manager Colm Bonnar. He won his first senior hurling medal in 2010 after winning The National hurling league Division 2. But Wexford were soon early exited by Galway in Leinster and Tipperary in the qualifiers.

References

Living people
Wexford inter-county hurlers
HWH Bunclody hurlers
Year of birth missing (living people)